In Greek mythology, Stichius (Ancient Greek: Στιχίος or Στιχίον) was an Athenian leader who participated in the Trojan War.

Mythology 
Together with Menestheus, another Athenian leader, Stichius carried the body of the Epeian commander Amphimachus off the battlefield during the siege of Troy. He later supported Menestheus against the attacks of Hector. Stichius was finally killed by the latter Trojan hero."Hector laid low Stichius and Arcesilaus, the one a leader of the brazen-coated Boeotians, and the other a trusty comrade of great-souled Menestheus".

Notes

References 

 Homer, The Iliad with an English Translation by A.T. Murray, Ph.D. in two volumes. Cambridge, MA., Harvard University Press; London, William Heinemann, Ltd. 1924. . Online version at the Perseus Digital Library.
 Homer, Homeri Opera in five volumes. Oxford, Oxford University Press. 1920. . Greek text available at the Perseus Digital Library.

Achaeans (Homer)